Breathe (stylised as breathe.) are an Australian minimal soul duo that blends soul and electronic music. They consist of Sean Walker (a founding member of the band Movement) and Andrew Grant. They are currently based in Sydney, Australia and Toronto, Canada.

History
Breathe was formed in Sydney in 2018. The band was founded by Sean Walker, who had founded the Australian "minimal soul" band Movement, and Andrew Grant.

Their debut single Are You All Good was released in September 2018 via the label Silk, and was described as "late night emotion." It was also released with a self-directed music video in collaboration with cinematographer Tim Nagle.

Breathe's second single London was premiered by Complex and The Line of Best Fit has compared the music to "the beauty of a peaceful night."

Their third single, Haze, was released in 2019. The music video for Haze was directed by Dave May of Tall Story Films.

Breathe's music was described as "minimal soul" as well as "late night soul" that is "brilliantly minimalistic." Rufus du Sol described the music as a "sultry underworld that pulls you right in", and Ta-ku said the band's music "hit me right in my feelings."

Indie Shuffle has compared the band to Moses Sumney and Michael Kiwanuka, and Hypebeast reviewed Haze as an "atmospheric" song that gives off a "ghostly yet lovesick vibe."

Members 
 Sean Walker – percussion, guitar, production, mixing (2018–present)
 Andrew Grant – bass guitar, synthesizers, production, mixing (2018–present)

Discography 
Singles
 Are You All Good? (2018)
 London (2019)
 Haze (2019)
 Grace (2020)
 Home (2020)
 It's Not The End (2021)

See also 
 Movement (band)
 Illangelo
 Minimal music

References 

2018 establishments in Australia
Australian soul musical groups
Australian electronic music groups
Musical groups established in 2018
Musical groups from Sydney